Buković is a village within the town Benkovac.

Population/Demographics
According to 1991 census, there were 904 inhabitants, of which 895 were Serbs and 9 others. According to national census of 2011, population of the settlement is 526.

References

External links
  

Benkovac
Populated places in Zadar County